International Student Exchange - Ontario (ISE Ontario) is a non-profit organization based in Barrie, Ontario that provides Ontario students the opportunity to participate in reciprocal student exchange programs with France, Switzerland, Spain, Germany, Italy and Quebec. 
These reciprocal exchange programs were first organized in Ontario by the Ontario Ministry of Education in the 1970s, but in the late 1990s the Ministry divested the programs, at which point ISE Ontario began running the programs.

Programs 

The organization offers the following programs:

Elementary Exchange:

9 week exchange program for Grade 8 students with France or Switzerland

Secondary Exchange:

12 week exchange program for secondary students (typically in grades 10 and 11) with France, Switzerland, Spain, Germany, or Italy

Summer Exchange:

3 week exchange program for students aged 13–17 with Switzerland or Quebec

4 week exchange program for students aged 13–17 with France, Spain, Germany, or Italy

Board of directors

The ISE Board of Directors, in its governing role, oversees the safe and effective delivery of programs in accordance with the mission, vision and values of the organization.

The current Board of Directors consists of:

Angela Phillips – Principal / Private Schools Representative

Bob Harper – Retired Coordinating Superintendent of Education

Brian Beal – Director of Education

Brent Bloch – Vice Principal

David Fox- Retired Superintendent  of Education

Lisa Walsh- Superintendent of Education

Mary Anne Alton – Retired Director of Education

Mary Jean Gallagher – Assistant Deputy Minister of Education

Paul Sloan – Superintendent of Education

S Michael Robertson –  Lawyer / Parent Representative

ISE Ontario Officers 

David Fox, Chair

Mary Anne Alton, Vice Chair

Bob Harper, Treasurer

External links 
 Official page

Educational organizations based in Ontario
Organizations based in Barrie